Henry Maingot was a French sailor who competed in the 1900 Summer Olympics in Meulan, France. Maingot took the 8th in the 1st race of the 3 to 10 ton.

References

External links

 

French male sailors (sport)
Sailors at the 1900 Summer Olympics – 3 to 10 ton
Sailors at the 1900 Summer Olympics – Open class
Olympic sailors of France
Year of birth missing
Year of death missing
Place of birth missing
Place of death missing